Warwick Irwin (born 3 June 1952) is a former Australian rules footballer who played for Fitzroy and Collingwood in the Victorian Football League (VFL). A rover, he won the club's best and fairest award in 1975. Irwin also features in the Fitzroy Team of the Century.

He is now a physical education teacher and lead co-ordinator at Mount Waverley Secondary College.

External links

1952 births
Australian rules footballers from Victoria (Australia)
Fitzroy Football Club players
Collingwood Football Club players
Victorian State of Origin players
Mitchell Medal winners
Port Melbourne Football Club players
Port Melbourne Football Club coaches
Living people